Vega4 was a four-piece alternative rock band formed in London consisted of Johnny McDaid (lead vocalist and songwriter), Bruce Gainsford (guitar), Gavin Fox (bassist) and Bryan McLellan (drummer).

McDaid is from Northern Ireland and Fox is from Republic of Ireland, McLellan is from Canada and Gainsford is from New Zealand. Vega4 was signed to Columbia Records in the UK, Epic Records in the US, and produced two albums, You and Others produced by Jacknife Lee (U2, Snow Patrol, Bloc Party) and "Satellites" produced by John Cornfield and Ron Aniello. The band played at the 2007 SXSW festival.

Vega4 premiered in the United States when its single "Life Is Beautiful" was featured in an episode of Grey's Anatomy and in the One Tree Hill episode, "Prom Night at Hater High". "Life is Beautiful" also featured in the 2010 film Streetdance, and previously in 2008's comedy film, Sex Drive.

Vega 4 also was featured on Paul Van Dyk's hit Time Of Our Lives in 2003.

Vega4's song "You and Me" was used by RTÉ 2FM to launch the station's new look and lineup. The band completed its first US tour in April 2007 in San Diego, California. Vega4 had been touring with Augustana for the previous several weeks. The band received much media attention in the US, with major radio support for "Life Is Beautiful" and the rumours of Gainsford's on-again, off-again romance with Scarlett Johansson. The band disbanded in 2008.

History

Formation and Satellites
McDaid and Walker formed Vega4 in 1999, adding Gainsford and McLellan through mutual friends. The band signed with indie label Taste Media in 2000, setting up distribution deals with Capitol Records in the U.S. and Festival Mushroom in Australia for their 2001 debut EP, Caterpillar, and the follow-up album, Satellites. Despite heavy touring and promotion, the album was not a success, and Vega4 went into a period of dormancy while extricating themselves from their various contracts.

You and Others
In 2006, Walker left Vega 4 while former Idlewild bassist Gavin Fox joined. Vega4 signed with Columbia Records in the U.K. and Epic Records in the U.S., which promoted the single "You and Me" somewhat disingenuously as the band's debut. The following single, "Life Is Beautiful," gained exposure through its use in episodes of the TV series Grey's Anatomy and One Tree Hill. Vega4's second album, You and Others, was released in late 2006 in the U.K. and mid 2007 in the U.S.

Discography

Albums
Satellites (2002)
You and Others (2006)

EPs
 Caterpillar (demo, 2000)
 Better Life (2001)
 Drifting Away Violently (2002)

Singles
"Sing" (2001)
"Radio Song" (2001)
"Love Breaks Down" (2002)
"Drifting Away Violently" (2002)
"Better Life" (2002)
"Time of Our Lives", with Paul van Dyk (2003)
"You & Me" (2006)
"Traffic Jam" (2006)
"Life Is Beautiful" (2006)

References

External links
Vega4's MySpace site
Vega4 performing at The Current

Vega4 at Discogs.com

British alternative rock groups
British indie rock groups
Musical groups established in 1999
1999 establishments in England